Javier Nicolás Rossi (born November 4, 1982, in La Plata) is an Argentine football forward currently playing for Club Atlético Platense in the Primera B Nacional.

Club career
Rossi started his career in 2003 playing for Defensores de Cambaceres in the Primera B Metropolitana. His high scoring effectivity awoke the interest of Almagro, which signed him in 2007. A year later Rossi and his goals went to join Tiro Federal.

On 18 July 2019 Club Atlético Platense announced, that they had signed Rossi.

References

External links
 Plantel de Tiro Federal 
 

1982 births
Living people
Footballers from La Plata
Association football forwards
Argentine footballers
Argentine people of Italian descent
Club Almagro players
Tiro Federal footballers
Defensores de Cambaceres footballers
Defensa y Justicia footballers
Independiente Rivadavia footballers
Nueva Chicago footballers
C.D. Huachipato footballers
Deportivo Morón footballers
Central Córdoba de Rosario footballers
Club Atlético Platense footballers
Primera Nacional players
Chilean Primera División players
Argentine expatriate footballers
Expatriate footballers in Chile